Trent O'Dea (born ) is an Australian male volleyball player. He is part of the Australia men's national volleyball team. On club level he plays for Delta Volley Porto Viro, an Italian Club currently in A2 Division.

References

External links
 profile at FIVB.org

1994 births
Living people
Australian men's volleyball players
Place of birth missing (living people)